Kitty Hawks Airways was founded in 1978, and offered passenger service that year only.  It was based at Dallas Love Field in Dallas in Dallas County, Texas. In 1987 the airlines acquired Skyfreighters in order to get the acquisition of FAR Part 121 certificate.

In 1990, the airline business was discontinued.

See also 
 List of defunct airlines of the United States

References

Defunct airlines of the United States
Airlines established in 1978
Airlines disestablished in 1990